The 1983 Borden Classic was a women's tennis tournament played on outdoor hard courts in Tokyo, Japan. It was part of the 1983 Virginia Slims World Championship Series. The tournament was held from 10 October through 16 October 1983. First-seeded Lisa Bonder won the singles title.

Finals

Singles
 Lisa Bonder defeated  Laura Arraya 6–1, 6–3
 It was Bonder's 2ns singles title of the year and the 4th and last of her career.

Doubles
 Chris O'Neil /  Pam Whytcross defeated  Brenda Remilton /  Naoko Satō 5–7, 7–6, 6–3

References

External links
 ITF tournament edition details

Borden Classic
Tennis tournaments in Japan
Borden Classic
Borden Classic